Saint Isidora, or Saint Isidore, was a Christian nun and saint of the 4th century AD. She is considered among the earliest fools for Christ. While very little is known of Isidora's life, she is remembered for her exemplification of the writing of St. Paul that “Whosoever of you believes that he is wise by the measure of this world, may he become a fool, so as to become truly wise.” The story of Isidora effectively highlights the Christian ideal that recognition or glory from man is second to one's actions being seen by God, even if that means one's actions or even one's self remains unknown or misunderstood. This ideal was extremely important to the early Desert Fathers and Mothers who recorded Isidora's story.

Early life
There are few biographical details concerning the life of Saint Isidora. Most of what is known can be found in the Lausiac History (Historia Lausiaca) written in 419-420 by Palladius of Galatia, at the request of Lausus, chamberlain at the court of the Byzantine Emperor Theodosius II. While other texts from this time mention the story of St. Isidora, the Lausiac History is the most commonly referenced text about the saint's life.

Isidora's birthdate is unknown, as is her age at the time she joined the Tabenna Monastery in Egypt. Tabenna, or Tabennesi, was the original monastery established by St. Pachomius sometime after 325 AD. Prior to that time, the tradition was for monastics to live alone as hermits or anchorites, each devoted to a Monastic rule they had individually received from God. St. Pachomius believed that groups of monastics living together would be able to better support each other in their devotion to Monastic rules and under the guidance of the Holy Spirit and his elder Palaemon, traveled to Tabennesi to establish his monastery. Subsequently, Pachomius's sister Maria, with his help, established a woman's monastery near her brother's, creating the first full community for women in Egypt.

It is unknown what year St Isidora came to the monastery established by Maria or how old she was at the time, however it is the events at the monastery that provide the few biographical details in existence.

The Monastery at Tabenna
At the time Isidora lived at the monastery, it is believed about four hundred women lived and worked there, devoting themselves to monastic life. As part of the community at the monastery, Isidora remained a type of outsider, known to wander about in the kitchen, focused on doing every type of menial job to be found. She was commonly referred to as "the monastery sponge," referring to the fact that she occupied herself by doing the dirtiest of jobs at the monastery. While it was said that Isidora was tonsured when joining the monastery, she stood apart from the other sisters by wearing a rag (most likely a dish towel from the kitchen) on her head. This type of head covering was in sharp contrast to the standard tonsure or cowls worn by the other sisters.

Madness
By all accounts, Isidora maintained a pattern of erratic behavior for which the other sisters at the monastery considered her "insane" or "demon possessed". In the Lausiac History, Palladius writes that Isidora “feigned madness and possession by a demon”, though no examples of her behavior are provided. However, her behavior was enough to alienate her from the other sisters and due to this perception of “madness” she was treated with derision and open contempt, sometimes being beaten for her behavior.

Palladius writes that Isidora was detested to the point that the other sisters would not eat with her (something that she purportedly preferred). It was noted that none of the four hundred sisters ever saw Isidora “chewing” (eating a formal meal) during the years of her life. Rather Palladius writes “she never sat at table, nor partook of a piece of bread, but wiping up the crumbs from the tables and washing the kitchen pots she was content with what she got in this way”, suggesting that Isidora subsisted mainly on crumbs left behind from the other sisters and the dishwater she used for cleaning. Palladius also writes that despite everything, “never did she insult any one nor grumble nor talk either little or much, although she was cuffed and insulted and cursed and execrated.”

Referenced in all accounts of Isidora, is that her madness or possession was “feigned” or a matter of pretend. Isidora's dedication to her Christianity led her to manifest the words of St. Paul who wrote “Whosoever of you believes that he is wise by the measure of this world, may he become a fool, so as to become truly wise.” The implication being that Isidora's commitment to her faith lead her to outwardly act as an afflicted person (keeping her true intentions to herself), while inwardly her suffering for the sake of being a “fool” became an act of worship.

Meeting St Pitirim
According to Palladius, at this time, living in the desert as a hermit or anchorite was Saint Pitirim (also Piteroum) who was well known and respected. As he was praying one day, an Angel appeared to him and asked, "Why are you proud of yourself for being religious and dwelling in a place like this? Do you want to see a woman who is more religious than you? Go to the monastery of the Tabennesi women and there you will find a woman wearing a crown on her head. She is better than you. For though she spars with so great a crowd, she has never let her heart go away from God. But you sit here and wander in imagination through the different cities."

After the appearance of the Angel, Saint Piteroum (who was said to have “never gone out”) sought permission from the spiritual leaders to visit the Convent. Since Piteroum was a renowned Elder and advanced in age, he was granted leave for the visit.

Upon arriving at the monastery, Piteroum asked to see all of the sisters. As he met each one, he did not see the one to which the Angel had referred as “wearing a crown on her head”. Piteroum asked if this was in fact all of the sisters in the monastery. They replied to him that there was a “sale” or mentally afflicted member of the community still working in the kitchen. Piteroum asked to see her as well. The sisters began to call for her, but Isidora did not answer. It is believed that Isidora's refusal to answer was due to her perceiving what was happening or even by possibly having a revelation. Lacking any response from Isidora, the sisters found and took hold of her, dragging her to Piteroum. When she was brought before Piteroum, he perceived the rag on her forehead (in some accounts he saw a crown appear above her) and he fell at her feet and said “Bless me”. Isidora fell before Piteroum in a like manner and asked “Do you bless me, Master?"

Witnessing this, the other sisters were shocked and said to Piteroum, “Father, do not let her insult you, she is sale”. Piteroum quickly replied to all by saying “You are sale. For she is Mother (Spiritual leader) both of me and you and I pray to be found worthy of her in the day of judgement”.

Having heard this, all of the other sisters fell at the feet of Piteroum and began to confess the ways in which they had mistreated Isidora; One sister claiming she had poured plate rinsings over her, another that she had physically hit her; another that she had applied a plaster over her nose. Eventually all the sisters confessed to abuses of some kind or another against Isidora. Piteroum then prayed with them all and went away.

Flight from monastery
Upon Piteroum's departure, treatment of Isidora changed dramatically within the monastery, as the sisters continued to ask her for forgiveness and began to revere Isidora as blessed. However, after a few days, unable to bear the glory and honor bestowed by the sisters, and burdened by their apologies, Isidora left the monastery.

Later life and death
After leaving the monastery, Isidora essentially disappeared. No stories, records or texts exist that indicate where she might have traveled to, how she lived, or how she died. Most modern scholarship suggests she died no later than the year 365 AD.

Canonization
The date of canonization for Saint Isidora is unknown. Having lived before the Sacred Congregation of Rites founded by Pope Sixtus V in 1588 (now the Congregation for the Causes of Saints), the records of Isidora's Canonization have been lost if ever they existed. During Isidora's life time, the process for canonization fell under Pre-Congregation, where designates for Sainthood could be canonized by a local bishop or primate based on devotion, which is likely what took place with her cause.

The Feast day of Isidora is celebrated by both the Eastern Orthodox Church and Roman Catholic Church on May 1 and may also be on May 10.

References

4th-century births
360s deaths
4th-century Roman women
Late Ancient Christian female saints
4th-century Christian saints